L'Aiguillon-sur-Mer (literally L'Aiguillon on Sea) is a former commune in the Vendée department in western France. It was merged with La Faute-sur-Mer to form L'Aiguillon-la-Presqu'île on 1 January 2022.

Population

Geography
The river Lay forms all of the commune's northwestern border, then flows into the Atlantic Ocean, which forms all of its western border.

See also
Communes of the Vendée department

References

Former communes of Vendée
Populated coastal places in France